The Augusta Mavericks were to be an indoor football team which will begin Southern Indoor Football League play in 2011.  Based in Augusta, Georgia, their home games will be played at the James Brown Arena.

The Mavericks are the third indoor/arena team to play in Augusta, following the af2's Augusta Stallions (2000–2002) and the Augusta Colts (known as the Spartans in 2006–2007) which played in the American Indoor Football Association and the World Indoor Football League from 2006 until suspending operations indefinitely in 2008.

External links
 Augusta Mavericks website (under construction)
 Augusta Mavericks team page on SIFL website

Southern Indoor Football League teams
Sports in Augusta, Georgia
2010 establishments in Georgia (U.S. state)
American football teams established in 2010
American football teams in Georgia (U.S. state)